Grupo Aldesa is a Costa Rican financial services consulting firm. It founded the a brokerage house, Aldesa Brokerage House, and was a founding firm of the Costa Rican national stock exchange.  It also created the first investment fund in Costa Rica in 1988.

History
The company was founded in 1968.

In 1976, Grupo Aldesa created the Aldesa Brokerage House ("Aldesa Puesto de Bolsa" name in Spanish) and was a founding firm of the Costa Rican national stock exchange ("Bolsa Nacional de Valores").  In 1988, Aldesa created the first investment fund in Costa Rica under the company name "Aldesa Sociedad de Fondos de Inversión S.A." through which Aldesa now operates a family of investment funds.  Aldesa is owned by the holding "Aldesa Corporación de Inversiones"

Aldesa began offering Internet access to investment clients' financial information in mid-1999, making it the second Costa Rican investment firm to offer internet-based services.

Aldesa is a registered financial services firm in Costa Rica by the regulatory body SUGEVAL (Superintendencia General de Valores) and is listed as "Grupo Bursátil Aldesa S.A."  Aldesa was authorized in September 1999.

References

Companies of Costa Rica
Investment banks
Brokerage firms